Ja'far is an Arabic given name and surname.

Ja'far or Jafar may also refer to:

Places
 Jafar, Iran, a village in Kurdistan Province
 Joghghal-e Aviyeh, Khuzestan Province, Iran, also known as Jafār, a village
 Ja'far, Hadhramaut, Yemen, a village in the Hadhramaut Governorate

Arts and entertainment
 "Jafar", a 2009 song from the Ares album by Salt the Wound
 Jafar, the main antagonist of Disney's Aladdin franchise
Jaffar, the main antagonist, played by Conrad Veidt, of The Thief of Bagdad (1940), produced by Alexander Korda